is a Japanese professional footballer.

College career
Endoh played four years with Maryland Terrapins at the University of Maryland. In 2016, he attended the MLS Combine for draft-eligible players ahead of the 2016 MLS SuperDraft, where he was named MVP.

Career
Endoh was drafted as the ninth overall pick in the 2016 MLS SuperDraft by Toronto FC and signed with the club on 27 February 2016. He made his professional debut on 6 March 2016 against the New York Red Bulls. He scored his first MLS goal on 7 May 2016, in Toronto FC's home opener against FC Dallas, at the newly renovated BMO Field, which ended in a 1–0 victory. At the end of 2017, he was released by the club, who declined to exercise their contract option on him.

In 2018, he went on a month-long trial with Belgian second division club KFCO Beerschot Wilrijk, but was not offered a contract and returned to Canada. On 2 August 2018, after not being offered a first-team deal, Endoh signed a USL contract with the second-team Toronto FC II. He made an immediate impact, scoring two goals and adding an assist in his fifth game back against Louisville City. He followed that up in his eighth game when he scored a hat trick against FC Cincinnati, his first career hat trick as a professional.

On 16 January 2019, Endoh rejoined Toronto's first team in Major League Soccer, signing an MLS contract. He made his first appearance of the season for Toronto on 26 June 2019, scoring the fastest goal in club history, only 29 seconds into the game against Atlanta United; Toronto went on to win the game 3–2.

In January 2022, Endoh signed a six month contract with Australian club Melbourne City in the A-League.

In August 2022, he joined LA Galaxy II in the USL Championship, scoring two goals on his debut on 27 August against Monterey Bay FC.

International career
Endoh has represented Japan at the U15 through U17 levels.

Personal life
From 2005 to 2011, Endoh was part of the Japan Football Association Academy in Fukushima. Forced to leave after the Fukushima earthquake, he moved to the United States in 2011, going to the University of Maryland. Since leaving Japan he has learned to speak English, a language he could not speak well in 2011.

In December 2022, he was diagnosed with acute leukemia.

Career statistics

Club

References

External links

 

1993 births
Living people
Japanese footballers
Japanese expatriate footballers
Association football midfielders
Expatriate soccer players in Canada
Expatriate soccer players in the United States
Major League Soccer players
Maryland Terrapins men's soccer players
Association football people from Tokyo
Toronto FC draft picks
Toronto FC players
Toronto FC II players
Melbourne City FC players
USL Championship players
USL League One players
University System of Maryland alumni
LA Galaxy II players